This is a list of Catholic schools in Hong Kong, ordered by the operator. Some are operated by the Roman Catholic Diocese of Hong Kong. Others are operated by religious orders or by Caritas.

Diocesan

Diocesan secondary
 Cheung Sha Wan Catholic Secondary School
 Choi Hung Estate Catholic Secondary School
 
 Kwun Tong Maryknoll College
 Lai King Catholic Secondary School
 
 
 Newman Catholic College
 Ng Wah Catholic Secondary School
 
 
 
 
 
  (聖安當女書院)
 
 St. Joan of Arc Secondary School
 St. Joseph's Anglo-Chinese School
 
 St. Teresa Secondary School
  (西貢崇真天主教學校(中學部))
 Tuen Mun Catholic Secondary School
 Tung Chung Catholic School
 Valtorta College
 
 Yu Chun Keung Memorial College No. 2 (余振強紀念第二中學)
 Yuen Long Catholic Secondary School

Diocesan primary

 Aberdeen St. Peter’s Catholic Primary School
 Bishop Ford Memorial School
 Bishop Walsh Primary School
 Castle Peak Catholic Primary School
 Catholic Mission School
 Chai Wan Kok Catholic Primary School
 Cheung Chau Sacred Heart School
 Cho Yiu Catholic Primary School
 Choi Wan St. Joseph’s Primary School
 Father Cucchiara Memorial School
 Good Counsel Catholic Primary School
 Holy Family School
 Jordan Valley St. Joseph’s Catholic Primary School
 Kowloon Bay St. John The Baptist Catholic Primary School
 Kowloon Tong Bishop Walsh Catholic School
 Laichikok Catholic Primary School
 Lei Muk Shue Catholic Primary School
 Ling To Catholic Primary School
 The Little Flower’s Catholic Primary School
 Lok Wah Catholic Primary School
 Mary of Providence Primary School
 Meng Tak Catholic School
 Ng Wah Catholic Primary School
 Our Lady of China Catholic Primary School
 Pak Tin Catholic Primary School
 Ping Shek Estate Catholic Primary School
 Price Memorial Catholic Primary School
 Raimondi College Primary Section (Private)
 Sacred Heart of Mary Catholic Primary School
 Sai Kung Sung Tsun Catholic School (Primary Section)
 St. Andrew’s Catholic Primary School
 St. Charles School
 St. Edward’s Catholic Primary School
 St. Francis of Assisi’s Caritas School
 St. Francis of Assisi’s English Primary School (Private)
 St. John the Baptist Catholic Primary School
 St. Joseph’s Anglo-Chinese Primary School (Private)
 St. Patrick’s School
 St. Patrick’s Catholic Primary School (Po Kong Village Road)
 St. Peter’s Catholic Primary School
 Sau Mau Ping Catholic Primary School
 Shak Chung Shan Memorial Catholic Primary School
 Sham Tseng Catholic Primary School
 Shek Lei Catholic Primary School
 Shek Lei St. John’s Catholic Primary School
 Tai Kok Tsui Catholic Primary School
 Tai Kok Tsui Catholic Primary School (Hoi Fan Road)
 Tin Shui Wai Catholic Primary School
 Tsuen Wan Catholic Primary School
 Tsz Wan Shan Catholic Primary School
 Tung Chung Catholic School
 Wong Tai Sin Catholic Primary School
 Yan Tak Catholic Primary School
 Yaumati Catholic Primary School
 Yaumati Catholic Primary School (Hoi Wang Road)

Diocesan kindergartens
 Annunciation Catholic Kindergarten (天主教領報幼稚園)
 Cheung Chau Sacred Heart Kindergarten (長洲聖心幼稚園)
 Our Lady of Lourdes Catholic Kindergarten (天主教露德聖母幼稚園)
 Raimondi College Kindergarten Section (高主教書院幼稚園部)
 Star of the Sea Catholic Kindergarten & Star of the Sea Catholic Nursery (天主教海星幼稚園．幼兒園)
 St. Andrew’s Catholic Kindergarten (天主教聖安德肋幼稚園)
 St. James Catholic Kindergarten (天主教聖雅各伯幼稚園)
 St. Jerome’s Catholic Kindergarten (天主教聖葉理諾幼稚園)
 St. Margaret Mary’s Catholic Kindergarten (天主教聖瑪加利大幼稚園)
 St. Peter’s Catholic Kindergarten (天主教聖伯多祿幼稚園)
 St. Stephen’s Catholic Kindergarten (聖斯德望天主教幼稚園)
 St. Teresa’s Kindergarten (聖德蘭幼稚園)
 St. Thomas’ Catholic Kindergarten (天主教聖多默幼稚園)
 Tai Po Catholic Kindergarten (天主教大埔幼稚園)
 Tsuen Wan Our Lady Kindergarten (荃灣聖母幼稚園)

References

Catholic
Roman Catholic Diocese of Hong Kong
Hong Kong